Labagoumen Manchu Ethnic Township is an ethnic township in northern Huairou District, Beijing, China. It borders Yangmuzhazi and Tanghe Township to its northwest, Wudaoyingzi Manchu Ethnic Township to its east, Changshaoying Manchu Ethnic Township and Tanghekou Town to its south, and Baoshan Town to its southwest. The population of this ethnic township was 4,034 as of the 2020 census. The name Labagoumen is referring to the place's geography at the foot of mountains, as the plain around Tang River widens southward like the opening of a trumpet.

History

Administrative divisions 
So far in 2021, Labagoumen Manchu Ethnic Township has direct jurisdiction over 15 villages:

Gallery

See also 

 List of township-level divisions of Beijing

References 

Huairou District
Ethnic townships of the People's Republic of China
Township-level divisions of Beijing